Derek Landmesser (born January 27, 1975) is a Canadian former professional ice hockey player and coach who most recently served as the head coach of the Southern Professional Hockey League’s (SPHL) Mississippi RiverKings.

Landmesser started his professional career as a defenceman in 1996 with his hometown team, the Thunder Bay Thunder Cats in Colonial Hockey League. He went on to play 15 seasons of professional hockey, including 10 seasons in the Central Hockey League (CHL) where he played 627 regular season games, scoring 563 points from the blue line. He was named the CHL's most outstanding defenceman for the 2000–01 CHL season, and was three times named to the All-CHL Team.

Landmesser retired as a player following the 2010–11 CHL season, and on August 1, 2011, Landmesser was announced as the new head coach of the Mississippi RiverKings.

On May 24, 2018, the Mississippi RiverKings ceased operations.

Career statistics

Awards and honours

References

External links

1975 births
Living people
Canadian ice hockey defencemen
Ice hockey people from Ontario
Manitoba Moose players
Memphis RiverKings players
Mississippi RiverKings (CHL) players
Muskegon Fury players
Rockford IceHogs (UHL) players
Southern Professional Hockey League coaches
Sportspeople from Thunder Bay
Thunder Bay Thunder Cats (CoHL) players
Thunder Bay Thunder Cats (UHL) players
Toronto Marlies players
Canadian ice hockey coaches